Ain Akrine, Ain Aakrine,    is a Maronite village in Koura District of Lebanon.  It was established in the early 19th century.

History
Before the 19th century, the land on which Ain Akrine stands today, was owned by AL HAJJ Youssef from Bnehrane. Following a dispute between two brothers, the family of EL KHOURY Ibrahim migrated from Kfarshakhna and settled in Ain Akrine.
During the Ottoman occupation, a group of Christians lived in this town to escape oppression. 
The village is also known as Nawous Town.

References

External links
 Ain Aakrine,  Localiban

Maronite Christian communities in Lebanon
Populated places in the North Governorate
Koura District